is an active stratovolcano located in Akan National Park in Hokkaidō, Japan. It is the tallest mountain in the Akan Volcanic Complex. 
The volcano consists of nine overlapping cones that grew out of the Akan caldera, on the shores of Lake Akan. Mount Meakan has a triple crater at its summit. According to its name and local legend, Mount Meakan is the female counterpart to Mount Oakan on the other side of Lake Akan.

Geography
There are two ponds in the crater, 赤沼 (Sekinuma, Red Pond) and 青沼 (Aonuma, Blue Pond).

See also
List of volcanoes in Japan

Notes

External links 
 Meakandake - Japan Meteorological Agency 
  - Japan Meteorological Agency
 Meakan Dake - Geological Survey of Japan
 

Mountains of Hokkaido
Volcanoes of Hokkaido
Highest points of Japanese national parks
Active volcanoes
Stratovolcanoes of Japan